Patrick Kühl (born 26 March 1968 in Güstrow, Mecklenburg-Vorpommern) is a former medley swimmer from East Germany, who won the silver medal in the 200 m individual medley for the GDR at the 1988 Summer Olympics in Seoul, South Korea.

See also
 List of German records in swimming

References

1968 births
Living people
German male swimmers
Male medley swimmers
Olympic swimmers of East Germany
Olympic swimmers of Germany
Swimmers at the 1988 Summer Olympics
Swimmers at the 1992 Summer Olympics
Olympic silver medalists for East Germany
Place of birth missing (living people)
European Aquatics Championships medalists in swimming
Medalists at the 1988 Summer Olympics
Olympic silver medalists in swimming
People from Güstrow
Sportspeople from Mecklenburg-Western Pomerania
20th-century German people
21st-century German people